Paraschistura montana is a species of stone loach endemic to Himachal Pradesh, India. It is placed in Schistura by some authorities.

References 

montana
Fish of Asia
Fish of India
Fish described in 1838